Cezeri is a quadcopter developed by Baykar Unmanned Aerial Vehicle Systems Co. in Turkey. It was named after Ismail al-Jazari (1136–1206),  a Muslim polymath: a scholar, inventor, mechanical engineer, artisan, artist and mathematician from Jazira in Mesopotamia. The  heavy prototype made the autonomous maiden flight midnight of September 2020, about one year after its introduction to the public at the 2019 Teknofest Istanbul.

Autonomous maiden flight
The initial test flights of the quadcopter took place on 11 September 2020. The first autonomous flights were made tied to the ground with ropes for safety reasons. The next two flight tests were conducted in untied free flight on 14 September 2020. All the autonomous flight tests were successful.

Characteristics
Cezeri takes off and lands vertical. It is powered by eight rechargeable electric batteries and propelled by eight brushless DC electric motors. It has three backup smart flight control systems. The endurance is expected to be about one hour after the advance of the battery technology. 

The vehicle was designed to be used in the urban aerial transportation for persons and cargo. The realization of its use in a populated urban environment can take 10-15 years while its use like a recreational vehicle in rural areas can be possible within 3-4 years as stated.

References

Quadcopters
Unmanned aerial vehicles of Turkey
Battery electric vehicles
Unmanned experimental aircraft
Aircraft first flown in 2020